The Men's Omnium is one of the 10 men's events at the 2010 UCI Track Cycling World Championships, held in Ballerup, Denmark.

This was the fourth time a men's omnium event had ever been included in the World Championships. Eighteen from 18 countries participated in the contest. The omnium consisted of five events, which were all contested on 28 March: a sprint 200 m time trial with a flying start, scratch race, 3 km individual pursuit, points race and a 1 km time trial.

Overall standings

Men's omnium
UCI Track Cycling World Championships – Men's omnium